Sixth Tone is a state-owned English-language online magazine published by Shanghai United Media Group.

Name 
Sixth Tone's name relates to the number of tones in Mandarin Chinese, but also is stated to carry more metaphorical meaning as well. Mandarin Chinese has four active tones and a fifth dropped tone that has less prominence than the other four. Because of the language's five tones, the publication's name refers to an ideal of expanding beyond traditionally-reported items in Anglophone media, making it the "sixth tone".

History
The online magazine began publication on April 6, 2016, with an investment of US$4.5 million from the Shanghai United Media Group. It is a sister publication of The Paper. Wei Xing was its first editor-in-chief until May 30, 2016, when he moved to create a start-up company and therefore no longer worked for the paper. Succeeding Wei, Zhang Jun became the new editor-in-chief that year.

By 2018, Western media began to cite Sixth Tone in news reports. Vincent Ni, in an essay published in Westminster Papers in Communication and Culture, stated that, "For foreign journalists, it has also shown a diverse and authentic side of China that rarely received much attention elsewhere" and that the publication "has proved far more effective than the hundreds of millions of dollars invested in English-language news programs by the state broadcaster Xinhua, CCTV, and CRI."

As of February 2023, internet users in Mainland China are blocked from accessing Sixth Tone.

Reception
Bethany Allen-Ebrahimian of Foreign Policy stated that Sixth Tone has a less staid and "saccharine" tone compared to many other English-language publications from China. She stated, "If webby U.S. media startup Vox were acquired by the Chinese Communist Party, it might resemble Sixth Tone".

In a 2016 interview with The New York Times, the then-editor-in-chief, Wei Xing, sought to differentiate his magazine from other Chinese English-language publications. Wei stated that compared to other government-owned news publications, Sixth Tone would have an easier time growing since it "lacks a politics-saturated bureaucracy because it is a start-up".

See also
Shanghai United Media Group
Qiushi

References

External links
 

Online magazines
2016 establishments in China
English-language magazines
Magazines established in 2016
Magazines published in Shanghai
Magazines published in China
State media
Organizations associated with the Chinese Communist Party